Henry George Sale (26 March 1889 – 30 August 1975) was an English first-class cricketer who played four matches for Worcestershire in the 1920s.

His highest score of 28 not out was achieved in the first innings of his final match, against Northamptonshire, and from number 11 in the order. However, his part in a last-wicket stand of 57 was unable to stave off an innings defeat.

Sale was born in Shipston-on-Stour, Warwickshire; he died in the same town at the age of 86.

External links 
 

1889 births
1975 deaths
English cricketers
Worcestershire cricketers
People from Shipston-on-Stour